DBK may refer to

DBK Historic Railway, a preserved railway association in Crailsheim, Germany
Development Bank of Kenya, a commercial bank in Kenya
Dragon Ball Kai or Dragon Ball Z, a Japanese anime television series 
Dubai Bank Kenya, a commercial bank in Kenya
Kurdish Supreme Committee, Desteya Bilind a Kurd (DBK) in Kurdish, a former umbrella organization in Syria
German Bishops' Conference, Deutsche Bischofskonferenz (DBK) in German, the episcopal conference of the bishops of the Roman Catholic dioceses in Germany
Dylan Bennet Klebold (1981–1999), teenage mass murderer